Ivan Petrovic (born 11 January 1980) is a Serbian footballer.

Early life and Club career
He was born in Svetozarevo (today Jagodina), then part of SFR Yugoslavia (now Serbia). He played many seasons for FK Napredak. In 2004, he was transferred to 2. Bundesliga team Alemannia Aachen but after having an unsuccessful season and playing only four games he returned to Serbia. In 2006, he moved to the Iran Pro League and played for Aboomoslem for two seasons which he became second best player of the whole 2007–08  IPL and the best foreign player of the season. For the next season he moved to Iranian champion Persepolis F.C. where he made the most assists (9) in the 2008–09 season.

Global
On 1 May 2016, he made his league debut with Global in a 4-2 win against Stallion.

Club career statistics
Last Update: 10 May 2013

Assists

Honours

Club
Shahin Bushehr
Hazfi Cup: Runner-up 2011–12

Individual
 Football Iran News & Events: Foreign player of the year (2007–08)
 Iran Football Federation Award:  Foreign player of the year (2007–08)
Iran Pro League: 2008–09 Most assists (9), shared with Esmail Farhadi and Mohammad Reza Khalatbari, Persepolis

References

External links

 Profile at PersianLeague
 

Sportspeople from Jagodina
1980 births
Living people
Serbian footballers
Serbian expatriate footballers
FK Napredak Kruševac players
FK Jagodina players
FK Obilić players
Alemannia Aachen players
F.C. Aboomoslem players
Persepolis F.C. players
Shahin Bushehr F.C. players
Sanat Mes Kerman F.C. players
Expatriate footballers in Germany
Expatriate footballers in Thailand
Expatriate footballers in Iran
Expatriate footballers in the Philippines
2. Bundesliga players
Persian Gulf Pro League players
Global Makati F.C. players
Association football midfielders